The Rumpus is an online literary magazine founded by Stephen Elliott, and launched on January 20, 2009. The site features interviews, book reviews, essays, comics, and critiques of creative culture as well as original fiction and poetry. The site runs two subscription-based book clubs and two subscription-based letters programs, Letters in the Mail and Letters for Kids.

The Rumpus has fostered writers, artists, and editors like Roxane Gay who served as Essays Editor and who credits the site for developing her audience, Isaac Fitzgerald who served as Managing Editor before moving to BuzzFeed to help create BuzzFeed Books, Rick Moody, Wendy MacNaughton, Paul Madonna, Peter Orner, Yumi Sakugawa, Steve Almond, and Cheryl Strayed, who began her "Dear Sugar" advice column on the site.

In July 2016, the site launched the Rumpus Lo-Fi Film Festival in Los Angeles as response to the high cost of other festivals.

In January 2017, The Rumpus was purchased by Marisa Siegel, previously the site's Managing Editor. Siegel was Editor-in-Chief and owner of The Rumpus for five years. Lyz Lenz previously served as Managing Editor before stepping down from the role in fall 2018 and joining The Rumpus Advisory Board.

In January 2022, Alyson Sinclair became the owner and publisher of The Rumpus and Alysia Li Ying Sawchyn took on the role of Editor-in-Chief.

References

External links

Letters in the Mail
Letters for Kids
Rumpus Book Club and Poetry Book Club

Literary magazines published in the United States
Online magazines published in the United States
Magazines established in 2009
Internet properties established in 2009
2009 establishments in the United States